HMS Otus was a Royal Navy Oberon-class submarine launched in 1962. She was decommissioned in the early 1990s and is now a naval museum in Germany.

Design and construction

The Oberon class was a direct follow on of the Porpoise-class, with the same dimensions and external design, but updates to equipment and internal fittings, and a higher grade of steel used for fabrication of the pressure hull.

Displacement was 1,610 tons standard, 2,030 tons full load when surfaced, and 2,410 tons full load when submerged. Propulsion machinery consisted of 2 Admiralty Standard Range 16 VTS diesel generators, and two  electric motors, each driving a  3-bladed propeller at up to 400 rpm. Eight  diameter torpedo tubes were fitted (six facing forward, two aft), with a total payload of 24 torpedoes. The boats were fitted with Type 186 and Type 187 sonars, and an I-band surface search radar. The standard complement was 68: 6 officers, 62 sailors.

Otus was laid down by Scotts Shipbuilding and Engineering Company on 31 May 1961, and launched on 17 October 1962. Sea trials were undertaken in Scottish waters, mainly Loch Long and Loch Fyne. The boat was commissioned into the Royal Navy on 5 October 1963.

Operational history
The first commission of Otus included large-scale missile trial exercises in the Atlantic Ocean and visits to the United States and Halifax, Canada.

Otus attended the 1977 Silver Jubilee Fleet Review off Spithead when she was part of the Submarine Flotilla.

In July 1987, a team of British, Commonwealth and international submariners took part in trials in Bjornafjorden, near Bergen, Norway, aboard Otus. At , individuals started to drop out. This set a new world record which to date has not been broken. Of the two record breakers, the first (the commander of the Submarine Escape Training Tower at HMS Dolphin) was a regular ascent under control. The second, a petty officer instructor from the Submarine Escape Training Tower suffered an emergency release having given the alarm signal whilst flooding up the chamber. It was considered safer and quicker to escape him rather than depressurise and drain down. Both escapees suffered no lasting effects and returned to normal service. Both received military honours of the British Empire in the following years for this act.

Otus was deployed to the Persian Gulf during the 1991 Gulf War under Operation Granby. On her return to Gosport, she was flying a Jolly Roger; the only indication that the submarine had been involved in deploying and recovering Special Air Service and Special Boat Service personnel.

Decommissioning and museum
Otus was decommissioned in the early 1990s and resided at Pound's scrapyard in Portsmouth for several years. She was later purchased by a German entrepreneur, who moored her in the harbour of the town of Sassnitz on the island of Rügen in Germany to act as a floating naval museum.

References

Publications

 

Oberon-class submarines of the Royal Navy
Ships built on the River Clyde
1962 ships
Cold War submarines of the United Kingdom
Museum ships in Germany